The 1978 NAIA Division I football season was the 23rd season of college football sponsored by the NAIA, was the ninth season of play of the NAIA's top division for football.

The season was played from August to November 1978 and culminated in the 1978 NAIA Division I Football National Championship. Known this year as the Palm Bowl, the title game was played on December 16, 1978 at McAllen Veterans Memorial Stadium in McAllen, Texas.

Angelo State defeated Elon in the Palm Bowl, 24–14, to win their first NAIA national title.

Conference changes
 This is the final season that the NAIA officially recognizes a football champion from two conferences, the Pennsylvania State Athletic Conference and the Southwestern Athletic Conference. The SWAC has since become an NCAA Division I FCS conference while the PSAC competes at the Division II level; both continue to sponsor football.

Conference standings

Conference champions

Postseason

See also
 1978 NAIA Division II football season
 1978 NCAA Division I-A football season
 1978 NCAA Division I-AA football season
 1978 NCAA Division II football season
 1978 NCAA Division III football season

References

 
NAIA Football National Championship